Viral is an upcoming Indian Bollywood 2016 based on social media film, directed by Raaj Nadar and produced by Anand Kumar and Endemol India under the Anand Kumar Productions banner. The principal photography of the film began in February 2016.

Mandana Karimi and Raghav Juyal will be in female and male lead roles respectively. The first look of the film was released on 3 January 2015.

Cast
Mandana Karimi
Raghav Juyal

Plot
The film is about an anthology of stories about how technology and social networks has changed the lives of people.

References

External links
 

Unreleased Hindi-language films
2010s Hindi-language films
Films shot in Mumbai
Films about social media